The 1975 Nations motorcycle Grand Prix was the fifth round of the 1975 Grand Prix motorcycle racing season. It took place on the weekend of 16–18 May 1975 at the Autodromo Dino Ferrari.

500cc classification

References

Italian motorcycle Grand Prix
Nations Grand Prix
Nations Grand Prix